The Curmuca barb (Hypselobarbus curmuca) is a species of ray-finned fish in the genus Hypselobarbus which is endemic to upland streams and rivers in southern India.

References

Curmuca barb
Freshwater fish of India
Curmuca barb